The Cockney Rebel – A Steve Harley Anthology is a remastered three-disc box-set anthology by Steve Harley, released in 2006. The anthology features material from Cockney Rebel, Steve Harley & Cockney Rebel and Harley's solo career. It covers all of Harley's albums, spanning over 33 years, from 1973's The Human Menagerie to 2005's The Quality of Mercy. The anthology was released by EMI Music UK. It was released on CD in the UK only. Today, the physical CD release is out-of-print.

The anthology was compiled by project manager Nigel Reeve and designed by Chris Peyton. The album's sleeve notes were written by Geoff Barton of Classic Rock magazine. Barton is a long-term fan of Harley. The final track on Disc 3, the live song "Only You", is highlighted as being previously unreleased, although it had originally appeared on the 1999 live album Stripped to the Bare Bones. A studio version of "Only You" was later recorded for Harley's sixth solo album Uncovered (2020).

Following its release, Harley spoke of the anthology in an October 2006 diary entry for his official website: "The Anthology is selling here in bucket-loads. I can't deny I'm proud of it. EMI have done a good job in all respects. You can't please everyone, but the 42 tracks seem a pretty fair reflection of my career so far." He later added in a January 2007 entry: "The Anthology release was the equivalent of the gold watch for long-service, but gave me lots of warm feelings."

Track listing

Disc one

Disc two

Disc three

Critical reception

Upon release, Carol Clerk of Classic Rock reviewed the anthology and stated: "Although Steve Harley is rightly remembered for his clutch of audacious pop hits with Cockney Rebel in the mid 70's, this three-CD set charts a long and accomplished career. "Sebastian" was a brave first single with its choral and orchestral dramas. Later favourites such as "Judy Teen" and "Mr Soft" were exquisitely crafted and arranged, and determinedly eccentric to boot. Intelligence has always been key to Harley's songwriting, which is why "Make Me Smile (Come Up and See Me)" still sounds fresh and innovative. Harley subsequently moved the band into more experimental areas for the albums Timeless Flight and Love's a Prima Donna. The American flavours and gospelly flourishes of Hobo with a Grin reflect Harley's residence in Los Angeles. He returned to music in the 90s, memorably with the slow-burning "All in a Life's Work" and "The Last Time I Saw You" from Poetic Justice. The Quality of Mercy, his most recent offering from 2005, explored extremely personal emotions, producing arguably Harley's most affecting collection to date."

Jake Jakeman of BBC Nottingham commented: "A three CD set might seem over the top for an artist we fondly remember for singing "Make Me Smile" and "Here Comes the Sun" and who now happily presents Sounds of the 70s on BBC Radio 2. Three CDs is a lot to maintain the quality threshold and by the time we reach the final collection the songs are a pale representation of what's gone before (although "Freedom's Prisoner" still has its merits). But it's good to have a substantial collection that shows the diversity of the man and his band." Chris Roberts of Uncut stated: "Harley's ever-changing band slid perfectly into the post-Ziggy/Roxy slipstream, all mannered English vocals, florid lyrics and sexual-theatrical rock. Tricksy hits like "Judy Teen" and "Mr Soft" displayed arch wit, whilst fan favourite "Sebastian" was a quite wonderful seven-minute epic. After the all-conquering "Make Me Smile", it was as if Harley was sated. His subsequent albums, both solo and under the band name, were measured and less edgy."

References

2006 compilation albums